Return is an inactive political party in Transnistria. In the 10 December 2000 legislative elections, the party won 1 seat out of 43. It did not participate in the 11 December 2005 legislative elections; however, some of its followers stand in local elections such as the 27 March 2005, municipal and city council elections.

Election results 

Political parties in Transnistria